Lucera is an Italian city of 34,243  inhabitants in the province of Foggia in the region of Apulia, and the seat of the Diocese of Lucera-Troia.

Located upon a flat knoll in the Tavoliere Plains, near the foot of Daunian Mountains, Lucera was the capital of Province of Capitanata and the County of Molise from 1579 until 1806.

Climate 

The city is characterized by a Mediterranean climate, with long, hot summers, with extreme temperature changes during the day, and mild winters, although due to its proximity to the Daunian mountains the temperature can drop to values below . The winds are quite frequent and, although sometimes quite strong, are usually moderate.

Snowfalls are rare.

History

Ancient era and early Middle Ages 
Lucera is located in the territory of the ancient tribe of the Daunii. Archeological excavations show the presence of a Bronze Age village inside the city boundaries. Lucera was probably named after either Lucius, a mythical Daunian king, or a temple dedicated to the goddess Lux Cereris. A third possibility is that the city was founded and named by the Etruscans, in which case the name probably means Holy Wood (luc = "wood", eri = "holy").

In 321 BC, the Roman army was deceived into thinking Lucera was under siege by the Samnites. Hurrying to relieve their allies the army walked into an ambush and were defeated at the famous Battle of the Caudine Forks. The Samnites occupied Lucera but were thrown out after a revolt. The city sought Roman protection and in 320 BC was granted the status of Colonia Togata, which meant it was ruled by the Roman Senate. In order to strengthen the ties between the two cities, 2,500 Romans moved to Lucera. From then on, Lucera was known as a steadfast supporter of Rome.

During the civil wars of the late Republic, Pompey set up his headquarters in Lucera, but abandoned the city when Julius Caesar approached. Lucera quickly switched its allegiance and Caesar's clemency spared it from harm. In the next civil war between Octavian and Mark Anthony the city did not escape as lightly. After the war, Octavian settled many veteran soldiers on the lands of the ruined city. This helped Lucera recover quickly and marked an era of renewed prosperity. Many of the surviving Roman landmarks hail from this Augustan period, among them the Luceran amphitheatre.

With the fall of the Western Roman Empire the city of Lucera entered into a state of decline. In 663 AD, it was captured from the Lombards and destroyed by the Eastern Roman Emperor Constans II. A year later in 664 AD, the town was sacked by Arabs of the Umayyad Caliphate.

Islamic period 

In 1224, Holy Roman Emperor Frederick II, responding to religious uprisings in Sicily, expelled all Muslims from the island, transferring many to Lucera (Lugêrah, as it was known in Arabic) over the next two decades. In this controlled environment, they could not challenge royal authority and they benefited the crown in taxes and military service. Their numbers eventually reached between 15,000 and 20,000, leading Lucera to be called Lucaera Saracenorum because it represented the last stronghold of Islamic presence in Italy.  During peacetime, Muslims in Lucera were predominantly farmers. They grew durum wheat, barley, legumes, grapes and other fruits. Muslims also kept bees for honey.

The colony thrived for 75 years until it was sacked in 1300 by Christian forces under the command of Giovanni Pippino di Barletta, with the acquiescence of Charles II of Naples. The majority of the city's Muslim inhabitants were slaughtered or – as happened to almost 10,000 of them – sold into slavery, or exiled, with many finding asylum in Albania across the Adriatic Sea. Their abandoned mosques were demolished, and churches were usually built in their place, including the cathedral of S. Maria della Vittoria. The city and its history of this period find mention in the novel A Sultan in Palermo by Tariq Ali.

After the Muslims were removed from Lucera, Charles tried to settle Christians in the city. Those Muslims that converted to Christianity got part of their property back, but none was restored his former position of political or economic influence. As time progressed, grain production fell in the city, and in 1339 the city was hit by a famine. Christians were allowed to farm as the Muslims.

Main sights
Sights in Lucera include:
the Roman Amphitheater, dating to Augustus' times and one of the largest in southern Italy. It was discovered in 1932: during the excavations, a statue of Augustus was found in the site. It measures c. , of elliptical plan, and could host from 16,000 to 18,000 spectators. The area measures 75.2 x 43.2 m. The amphitheater could be accessed from two large portals, one towards Lucera and one towards Foggia; the two side accesses, as well as the external walls, are no more visible. It was perhaps destroyed in the capture of the city by the Eastern Roman Emperor Constans II in 663.
the medieval Castle
the Church of St. Francis
the Cathedral, built in 1300 on the grounds of the last standing medieval mosque in Italy, which had been destroyed the same year.
Church of the Carmen
Church of St. Dominic
Church of St. Antony the Abbot, whose dome was once part of the city's mosque.
Church of St. John the Baptists

Economy
The commune of Lucera is home to the Denominazione di origine controllata (DOC) wine of Cacc'e mmitte di Lucera. This red Italian wine is said to have gotten its name from the local dialect referring to the act of pouring a wine from cask to goblet and going back for seconds. The DOC includes 80 hectares (198 acres) of land around the commune with all grapes destined for DOC wine production needing to be harvested to a yield no greater than 14 tonnes/ha. The wine is made primarily (35-60%) from the Uva di Troia grape (known in Lucera under the synonym Sumarello), Montepulciano, Sangiovese and Malvasia nera (the latter three grapes collectively making up between 25-35% of the blend). White wine grape varieties are also permitted in this red wine with Trebbiano Toscano, Bombino bianco and Malvasia del Chianti collectively allowed to account for between 15-30% of the blend. The finished wine must attain a minimum alcohol level of 11.5% in order to be labelled with the Cacc'e mmitte di Lucera DOC designation.

International relations

Twin towns – Sister cities
Lucera is twinned with:
 Jesi, Italy, since 1970
 San Cipirello, Italy, since 1989
 Trogir, Croatia, since 1970

See also
History of Islam in southern Italy
Bishopric of Lucera–Troia

References

Sources 
Alexander Knaak: Prolegomena zu einem Corpuswerk der Architektur Friedrichs II. von Hohenstaufen im Königreich Sizilien 1220–1250, Marburg 2001.  (For the medieval Lucera Castle of the Hohenstaufen see pp. 24–38)
 Aalulbayt Library, 
Taylor, Julie. Muslims in Medieval Italy: The Colony at Lucera. Lexington Books,  2005.
 University of Michigan-Dearborn,  UM-Dearborn professor publishes history of Muslim community in medieval Italy (press release), 20 November 2003

Cities and towns in Apulia